Travis Meyer is chief meteorologist at the Tulsa News Station KOTV, Channel 6. He transferred from another Tulsa station, KTUL, Channel 8. Meyer has been on television in Tulsa for more than 25 years providing weather information to the people of eastern Oklahoma. When Meyer switched to KOTV Channel 6, he would eventually fill the spot of veteran and much respected meteorologist Jim Giles.

References

External links
The News on 6
Oklahoma's News Channel 8

Living people
Television personalities from Tulsa, Oklahoma
Year of birth missing (living people)
American television meteorologists